Raimo Yrjö Heinonen (born 29 May 1935 in Turku) is a Finnish former gymnast who competed in the 1956 Summer Olympics, in the 1960 Summer Olympics, and in the 1964 Summer Olympics.

References

1935 births
Living people
Finnish male artistic gymnasts
Olympic gymnasts of Finland
Gymnasts at the 1956 Summer Olympics
Gymnasts at the 1960 Summer Olympics
Gymnasts at the 1964 Summer Olympics
Olympic bronze medalists for Finland
Olympic medalists in gymnastics
Sportspeople from Turku
Medalists at the 1956 Summer Olympics
20th-century Finnish people